The Chevrolet Turbo-Thrift engine is a straight-six produced from 1962 to 2001 by the Chevrolet Division of General Motors. The entire series of engines was commonly called Turbo-Thrift, although the name was first used on the 230 cubic inch version that debuted in 1963. The new engine featured seven main bearings in lieu of the four bearing design of its predecessor, the "Stovebolt" engine, and was considerably smaller and approximately 100 lbs lighter.

There were other major differences between the Turbo-Thrift engine and the Stovebolt:

Bore spacing matches the Chevrolet small-block V8's 4.4 inches,
Stroke of the 194 and 230 engines is the same  as the 327 small-block and 348 big-block V8s
Wedge-type "closed chamber" cylinder heads with a "squish" area surrounding the combustion chamber cavity,
Stamped ball-pivot stud-mounted rocker arms were introduced, similar to the V8, with a 1.75:1 ratio, rather than the earlier shaft-mounted 1.477:1 rockers.

The first use of the new engine series was the  Hi-Thrift version in the 1962 Chevy II; the following year, Chevrolet passenger cars adopted the  version across the range. Studebaker and Checker also began using the engine in 1965. Chevrolet and GMC trucks, which previously used the Stovebolt and GMC V6 engines also switched to using the Turbo-Thrift from 1963 through 1988, as did Pontiac in 1964 and 1965. A  inline-4 version of this engine was also offered in the Chevy II/Nova line through the 1970 model year.

After several years of steadily declining sales (just 3,900 units in the 1972 model year) the straight six was dropped from Chevrolet's full-sized cars for 1973, the first time the full-sized Chevrolet hadn't been available with a six-cylinder since 1928. However, when the B-body line was downsized in 1977 the engine was reintroduced. Sidenote: the base six cost about US$334 less than a V8, and weighed some  less.

Overseas, the engine was also mass-produced in Brazil. It was used in the Chevrolet Opala from 1969 (230) to 1992 (250). It was already used in light trucks as the A and Chevrolet Veraneio. The Brazilian version of the GMT400 – the Brazilian Chevrolet Silverado – is powered with a 4.1 instead of the Vortec 4300 V6. Brazilian produced sixes manufactured to the 2001 model year gained multipoint fuel injection, unlike the US-manufactured sixes, which retained the Rochester Monojet one-barrel carburetor. These inline sixes and their four-cylinder siblings were converted for marine usage by Mercruiser and Volvo Penta, and also used in stationary applications (such as power generation) and in Clark forklifts. Aftermarket port fuel injection and re-engineered cylinder heads have been the norm although parts for the six e.g. aftermarket intake manifolds (from a three-carburetor setup or a single 4-barrel carburetor), exhaust headers, and/or hybrid cylinder heads based on the small block are costlier than the Small Block Chevrolet, unlike the rival AMC inline six (which has a cult following with Jeep enthusiasts, especially with the 4.0 L). Besides Brazil, the six was also manufactured in Argentina and South Africa.

194
The Hi-Thrift 194 was introduced as the optional engine in the 1962 Chevy II. It was also optional in the 1964 G10 Chevy Van -ton vans, and standard in the G10 in 1965 and 1966; it was not available in the C/K10 -ton trucks.

The 194 variant ended production in North America after 1967, but remained in use by General Motors' Argentinian subsidiary until the mid-1970s. GM de Argentina also developed a  four-cylinder version called the "Chevrolet 110" for their Opel K 180 compact car.

 1962–1967 Chevy II
 1962–1974 Chevrolet 400 (Argentina)
 1962–1967 Acadian (Canada)
 1964–1967 Chevrolet Chevelle
 1964–1967 Chevrolet El Camino
 1965–1966 Studebaker Commander, Daytona ('66 only), Cruiser and Wagonaire (built by McKinnon Industries in Canada)
 (Circa 1965–66) Holden HD (South Africa)
 (Circa 1966–67) Holden HR (South Africa)
 1966 Beaumont (Canada)

215
Pontiac's  (1964–1965) was a smaller bore of  version of the  Chevrolet straight-6 engine. One oddity is the crankshaft bolt pattern - in lieu of the Chevrolet V8 bolt pattern (also shared with the rest of the third generation six) the Pontiac V8 bolt pattern is used.

230
The Turbo-Thrift 230 (also known as the High Torque 230 in Chevrolet trucks), with  displacement, replaced the long-stroke  version of the Stovebolt six beginning in 1963. It was also used by Chevrolet and GMC trucks, primarily for the half-tons. North American production of this variant ceased in 1970. It was also built in Latin America and was in production in South Africa until at least 1982, where it powered a multitude of different cars. A four-cylinder version of this engine was also built, the Super-Thrift 153.

 1963–1965 Chevrolet Biscayne/Bel Air
 1963–1965 Chevrolet & GMC pickup trucks
 1963–1968 Chevrolet P-10 Step-Van
 1963–1965 Pontiac Strato-Chief/Laurentian/Parisienne (Canada)
 1964–1965, 1968–1970 Acadian (Canada)
 1964–1974 Chevrolet 400 (Argentina)
 1964–1969 Chevrolet Chevelle
 1964–1970 Chevrolet Chevy II / Nova
 1964–1970 Chevrolet El Camino
 1965–1968 Checker Marathon
 1965–1969 Chevy Van (G-10, G-20)
 1966–1969 Beaumont (Canada)
 1966 Studebaker Commander, Wagonaire, Daytona and Cruiser
 (Circa 1966–67) Holden HR (South Africa) 
 1967–1969 Chevrolet Camaro
 1968–1971 Chevrolet Opala (Brazil)
 1973-1979 Chevrolet 3800 (South Africa)
 1978-1982 Chevrolet Commodore (South Africa)

250
The Turbo-Thrift 250 (also known as High Torque 250 in trucks) version was introduced in 1966, with the same  bore as the 230 and a longer  stroke for a larger  displacement. Between 1975 and 1984, an integrated cylinder head was produced (intake manifold and cylinder head were a single casting with a bolt on exhaust manifold), with one-barrel intakes for passenger cars, and two-barrel intakes for trucks after 1978. The "integrated" cylinder head and intake manifold claimed to have resulted in increased low end torque and fuel economy inclusive of a smoother operation which pre-dated NVH (noise, vibration, and harshness). Some pundits .

The engine was sold in various states of tune and under several different RPO codes over its production life. The L22 was the passenger car version, sold until 1979. The LD4 was the truck version, sold until 1978. The LE3 replaced the LD4 in 1979 and was produced until 1984.

In the late-1970s the Chevrolet 200, Chevrolet 229 and Buick 231 V6 engines gradually replaced the 250 straight six in passenger cars in North America, with use of the engine discontinued after the 1979 model year. The 250 engine continued to be used in GM trucks until 1984, after which it was replaced by the 4.3 L V6 (essentially a  Chevy small-block V-8 with the two rear cylinders removed). It was also used in a number of large sedans by Chevrolet of South Africa until 1982.

Production continued in Brazil (known as the 4.1 there) until 1998 in passenger cars, when the Chevrolet Omega A was replaced by rebadged Australian Holdens. It was used until 2001 in the Brazilian Chevrolet Silverado, after which the engine line was discontinued. Latter-day Brazilian-produced engines featured electronic multipoint fuel injection, distributorless ignition system and redesigned cylinder heads with smaller intake ports.

GM did not produce another straight-six engine in North America until the introduction of the GM Atlas engine in late 2001.

 1966–1984 Chevrolet (passenger cars to 1979, trucks/vans to 1984)
 1966–1970 Pontiac Strato-Chief (Canada)
 1966–1972 Pontiac Laurentian (Canada)
 1966–1969, 1977-1979 Pontiac Parisienne (Canada)
 1967–1971 Acadian (Canada)
 1967–1969 Beaumont (Canada)
 1967–1979 Chevrolet Camaro
 1968–1974 Chevrolet 400 (Argentina)
 1968–1971 Buick Skylark
 1968–1972 Buick Sport Wagon
 1968–1969 Buick Special
 1968–1972 Oldsmobile F-85
 1969–1978 Chevrolet Constantia (South Africa)
 1969–1979 Checker Marathon
 1970–1976 Pontiac Firebird
 1970 Pontiac Tempest
 1970–1976 Pontiac LeMans
 1970–1974 Puma GTB (Brazil)
 1971-???? AMC Hornet (South Africa - South African tariff laws called for local content where the Chevrolet six was domestically manufactured)
 1971-1978 Chevrolet Chevy (Argentina)
 1971–1992 Chevrolet Opala (Brazil)
 1971–1975 Pontiac Ventura
 1973–1975 Buick Apollo
 1973-1978 Chevrolet 4100 (South Africa)
 1973-1982 Chevrolet Commodore (South Africa)
 1973-1976 Oldsmobile Omega
 1975–1976 Oldsmobile Cutlass
 1977–1979 Pontiac Catalina
 1979-1982 Chevrolet Senator (South Africa)
 1979–1994 Chevrolet Veraneio (Brazil)
 1988–1992 Puma AMV (Brazil)
 1995–1998 Chevrolet Omega A (Brazil)
 1998–1999 Chevrolet Tahoe (Argentina)
 1998–1999 Chevrolet Silverado - (GMT400) (Brazil)

250-S
When long distance racing restarted in Brazil in 1973, the Chevrolet Opala and the Ford Maverick were the main contenders. The Maverick's engine was almost one liter larger than the Opala's, however. Drivers Bob Sharp and Jan Balder, who shared a ride to second place in the "24 Hours of Interlagos" in August of that year in an Opala, pressured General Motors do Brasil to field a more powerful racing engine.

By coincidence, engine development manager Roberto B. Beccardi had already been working on such a performance engine project out of his own initiative, but had lacked factory support or approval. Thus, in July 1974, GM started to offer the 250-S engine as an option for the Opala 4100. It was slightly different from the version launched two years later: the project engine was similar to the four-cylinder units, did not get a vibration damper, and used the cooling fan from the standard 2500, with four blades instead of six.

 1974–1980 Chevrolet Opala SS (Brazil)
 1977–1980 Chevrolet Opala Caravan SS (Brazil)
 1981–1988 Chevrolet Opala - All Line (Brazil)
 1974–1987 Puma GTB (Brazil)
 1978–1988 Santa Matilde SM4.1 (Brazil)

292
The High Torque 292 engine, displacing , was used in Chevrolet and GMC trucks beginning in 1963 and Step-Van/Value-Vans beginning in 1964. It was also the standard engine in the Chevy Van/GMC Vandura G20 and G30 from 1975 to 1978. It is differentiated from the 194/230/250 engines by a  taller block deck and relocated passenger-side engine mount. Although it had had a larger displacement than its  Stovebolt predecessor it was approximately  shorter and  lower. Flywheel bolt pattern is the same as the six and V8 - with  bolts for the flywheel if produced after the 1966 model year.

Production of the engine was shifted to Mexico in 1980, and later variants of this engine were marketed as the High Torque 4.8 L and by its RPO code "L25". It retained the separate intake (with a Rochester Monojet carburetor) and exhaust manifolds as used with the short deck motors (194-250).

Availability of the 4.8 L engine was slowly curtailed from the late 1970s until production ceased entirely in 1988, and it was replaced by the 4.3 L V6. By 1987 it was only available (outside of California) as an option in -ton and 1-ton R/V-series trucks, and as the base engine in P20 and P30 Step-Vans.

See also
 Chevrolet Stovebolt engine
 List of GM engines
 Chevrolet Straight-4 engine
 General Motors Atlas engine#LL8 (Vortec 4200)
 Duramax I6 engine

References

External links
67–72chevytrucks.com — Founded for the 67-72 trucks, it is now an online forum community devoted to all years & models full size Chevy/GMC Trucks. From stock originals, to mud trucks, to show stoppers... our members have them all.

Chevrolet engines
GMC engines
Straight-six engines